The 1983–84 Rugby League Premiership was the tenth end of season Rugby League Premiership competition.

The winners were Hull Kingston Rovers.

First round

Semi-finals

Final

References

1984 in English rugby league